West Louisville is an unincorporated community in Daviess County, Kentucky, United States. West Louisville has a post office with ZIP code 42377.

Demographics

References

Unincorporated communities in Daviess County, Kentucky
Unincorporated communities in Kentucky